Mount Surround is a rural locality in the Shire of Burdekin, Queensland, Australia. In the  Mount Surround had a population of 145 people.

History 
Mount Surround State School opened circa 1932 and closed circa 1968.

In the  Mount Surround had a population of 145 people.

Road infrastructure
The Bruce Highway runs through from south-east to north.

References 

Shire of Burdekin
Localities in Queensland